INHS may refer to:
 Illinois Natural History Survey at the University of Illinois at Urbana-Champaign
 Iloilo National High School, Iloilo City, Philippines
 Inland Northwest Health Services in Spokane, Washington, United States
 Isabela National High School, Ilagan, Isabela, Philippines